An Ungentlemanly Act is a 1992 BBC television film about the first days of the invasion of the Falkland Islands in 1982.

Production
The film was written and directed by Stuart Urban, and commissioned to mark the tenth anniversary of the Falklands War. The film was closely based on the historical record, and all of the major incidents portrayed were drawn from contemporary accounts by those who took part. Filming took place on the Falkland Islands and at Ealing Studios. Urban is a fluent Spanish-speaker, and plays an uncredited role as an Argentine radio operator.

Ian Richardson replaced Ian Holm as Falklands Governor Rex Hunt after Holm dropped out of the production at the last minute. Bob Peck plays Major Mike Norman, the commander of the Royal Marines based at Stanley, while Norman himself acted as advisor on the production, and has a small part as a member of the Falkland Islands Defence Force (FIDF). Don Bonner, who was Governor Hunt's chauffeur at the time of the conflict, cameos in a scene set in Stanley store where he says "Hello Don" to the actor playing him.

Reception 
The film was well-received on release and is generally considered to be an accurate and even-handed portrayal of events. It won the BAFTA Award for Best Single Drama the following year, and was later shown on television in Argentina.

Awards 
 BAFTA Awards 1993
Won: BAFTA TV Award for Best Single Drama: Bradley Adams  & Stuart Urban
Nominated: BAFTA TV Award for Best Actor: Ian Richardson
 Royal Television Society 1993
Nominated: RTS Television Award for Best Actor (Male): Ian Richardson

Cast
 Ian Richardson ....  Governor Rex Hunt
 Bob Peck ....  Maj. Mike Norman
 Rosemary Leach ....  Mavis Hunt
 Ian McNeice ....  Dick Baker
 James Warrior ....  Don Bonner
 Marc Warren ....  Tony Hunt
 Elizabeth Bradley ....  Nanny
 Kate Spiro ....  Connie Baker
 Holly Barker ....  Baker Girl #1
 Claire Slater ....  Baker Girl #2
 Hugh Ross ....  Maj. Garry Noott
 Ian Embleton ....  Cpl. 'Geordie' Gill
 Aidan Gillen ....  Marine Wilcox
 Richard Graham ....  Cpl Lou Armour
 Matthew Ashforde ....  Marine Farnworth
 Richard Long ...  Marine Dorey
 Garry Cooper ...  Colour Sgt. Muir
 Phil Atkinson ...  Sgt. Short
 Christopher Northey ...  Maj. Phil Summers (FIDF)
 Chris Walker ...  'Ex-Marine' Jim Fairfield (as Christopher Walker)
 Mike Norman ...  F.I.D.F. Stalwart
 Christopher Jaffray ...  F.I.D.F. Youth 1
 Simon Godwin ...  F.I.D.F. Youth 2
 Jonathan Cohen ...  Marine #1
 Lee Alliston ...  Marine #2
 Alex Norton ...  Chief of Police Ronnie Lamb
 Gary Clement ...  Butcher
 Harry Jones ...  Henry Halliday
 Trevor Cooper ...  Des King
 Morag Siller ...  Alison King
 Flip Webster ...  Mrs King
 Mike Grady ...  Patrick Watts
 Tom Hodgkins ...  Tom Olsen
 Ann Reid ...  Mrs. Mozeley
 Simon Fisher-Becker ...  Prisoner
 Adam Godley ...  P.C. Anton Livermore
 Janet Robertson ...  Sonia
 Helen Blades ...  Sonia's Friend
 Antonio Valero ...  Vice-Commodore Hector Gilobert
 Fulgencio Saturno ...  Vice-Adm. Carlos Büsser
 Alan Turner ...  Maj. Patricio Dowling
 Arturo Venegas ...  Capt. Pedro Giachino
 Ricardo Vélez ...  Lt. Lugo
 Vincent S. Boluda ...  Lt. Quiroga
 Robert Reina ...  Medic Ernesto Urbina
 Juan Martinez ...  Marine
 Paul Geoffrey ...  Simon Winchester
 Stuart Urban ...  Argentinian 'snatch squad' radio operator (uncredited)
 Crew of British yacht Creighton's Naturally ... Argentine Marines (uncredited)

See also
 Cultural impact of the Falklands War
The Falklands Play
Tumbledown

External links 

 

BBC television dramas
1992 television films
1992 films
British television films
British films based on actual events
Falklands War films
British war films
BAFTA winners (television series)
Films directed by Stuart Urban
1992 in British television
1990s British films